The George W. Gordon Farm is an historic home and farm which is located in Whiteley Township in Greene County, Pennsylvania.

It was listed on the National Register of Historic Places in 2000.

History and architectural features
Built in 1879, the farmhouse on this historic property is a two-story, five-bay brick dwelling, which was designed in the Italianate style. It features a one-story, three-bay porch, which was added sometime around 1920.

Also located on the property are a number of contributing farm outbuildings.

This property was listed on the National Register of Historic Places in 2000.

References

Houses on the National Register of Historic Places in Pennsylvania
Italianate architecture in Pennsylvania
Houses completed in 1879
Houses in Greene County, Pennsylvania
National Register of Historic Places in Greene County, Pennsylvania